The Hunter-class frigate is a future class of heavy frigates for the Royal Australian Navy (RAN) to replace the . Construction is expected to begin in 2022, with the first of nine vessels to enter service in 2031. 

The genesis of the Future Frigate Program came in 2009, when the Rudd Government’s Defence White Paper signalled Australia’s intent to "acquire a fleet of eight new Future Frigates, which will be larger than the Anzac-class vessels" with a focus on anti-submarine warfare. With an initial tender expected in 2019–20, in 2014 the Abbott Government announced that work had been brought forward, funding a preliminary design study focussed on integrating a CEAFAR Radar and Saab combat system on the hull of the  destroyer.

Following a report by the RAND Corporation into options for Australia's naval shipbuilding industry, the Government announced an $89 billion naval shipbuilding plan. This plan brought the schedule of the Future Frigate Program forward by three years and announced a "continuous onshore build program to commence in 2020" in South Australia. A competitive evaluation process was announced in April 2016, and a request for tender was released in March 2017 to three contenders: Navantia, Fincantieri, and BAE Systems as part of a competitive evaluation process.The program is expected to cost AU$35 billion.

In June 2018, the BAE Systems Type 26 was selected as the winner.

Project history

Planning 
The 2009 Defence White Paper outlined "ambitious plans for the Navy’s surface fleet." At its centre was the requirement for twelve Future Submarines and "eight new Future Frigates, which will be larger than the Anzac-class vessels" with a focus on anti-submarine warfare. The accompanying Defence Capability Plan stated that a Government decision would be expected "beyond 2019."

The 2013 Defence White Paper reaffirmed the Future Frigate program and suggested that the replacement of the  vessels could be brought forward. In the early 2010s, there was significant concern over the 'valley of death' in Australian shipbuilding following the conclusion of the  destroyer program. With concerns both over the cost and management of the Hobart-class program and a union campaign calling for job security at government-owned shipyard ASC, the Abbott Government committed over $78 million to preliminary studies to determine whether the Hobart-class hull could be utilised for the Future Frigate.

The 2016 Defence White Paper increased the number of future frigates by one to a total of nine ships.

Against this backdrop, the Abbott Government commissioned a study by the RAND Corporation to determine options for the future of naval shipbuilding in Australia. The report found that:
 Australia could sustain a naval ship building industrial base by carefully managing a continuous ship building strategy in the longer–term, with a regular pace of delivering the new ships. But this would need to be premised on reform of the Australian naval ship building industry and significant improvement in productivity.
 Australian naval ship builders can sustain an 18–24 month pace of large ship construction starts if Defence carefully manages its acquisition program and keeps the Future Frigates operational for 25 to 30 years.
 The gap between the completion of the Air Warfare Destroyer project and the start of the Future Frigate cannot be overcome, but the impact could be lessened. The cost of building naval ships in Australia is 30–40 per cent greater than United States benchmarks, and even greater against some other naval ship building nations. Australia is currently one of the most expensive places to build naval vessels. This premium can be reduced by improved productivity.

In response to the RAND report, the Government announced a $89 billion shipbuilding program. This included bringing forward the Future Frigate program with a "continuous onshore build programme to commence in 2020." The budget for the program has been confirmed as "more than $35 billion" and the Government claims it will "directly create over 2,000 jobs." All nine vessels will be constructed in Adelaide, South Australia.

Tender process 
In April 2016 the government announced a competitive evaluation process between Navantia, Fincantieri and BAE Systems for the Future Frigate Program. Additionally, a tender for the combat system was also held between Saab and Lockheed Martin. In October 2017, the government announced that the Aegis combat system and a Saab tactical interface would be used for the class.

Navantia (F-5000) 
Navantia offered an evolution of its F-100 base design, which forms the basis for the Hobart-class destroyers currently being built in Adelaide for the RAN. In 2014, the Australian Government commissioned a study to use the Hobart-class hull which Navantia claims shows it could be adapted to meet the requirements of the Future Frigate program, including integration of the CEAFAR radar and Saab 9LV combat system. Based on this study, a Navantia-designed Future Frigate would have 75 per cent systems commonality with the Hobart-class destroyers. Systems on the Hobart class include a 48-cell Mk41 vertical launch system, five-inch Mark 45 naval gun, undersea warfare capabilities including a hull mounted sonar and active and passive towed variable depth sonar, as well as the capability to operate a MH-60R "Romeo" Seahawk.

The Hobart-class Air Warfare Destroyer program has attracted criticism for cost and schedule over-runs: by 2015 the program was three years behind schedule and $800 million over budget. In late 2015, Navantia was selected to bring a shipbuilding management team into government-owned shipyard ASC as part of the AWD reform program. Following the reform program, initiated by ASC prior to Navantia management integration, ASC has stated that "when we reach our budget on ship three...we will be as good as the other Aegis yards in the world."

Fincantieri (Modified FREMM) 
Fincantieri offered the anti-submarine warfare (ASW) variant of its FREMM frigate (Bergamini class). Fincantieri originally said that the general hull configuration of the Bergamini design will require little or no modification to meet Australian requirements, including the incorporation of the CEAFAR radar, although it has confirmed that some redesign would have been required to incorporate the US Navy Mark 45 five inch naval gun. In 2016, then Australian Defence Minister Christopher Pyne stated that "one of the advantages for this company is that this vessel has been built, it is already in operation. One of the disadvantages is that the company doesn't operate here."

BAE Systems (Type 26/Global Combat Ship) 
BAE Systems offered an export variant of its Type 26. The Type 26 and the smaller, cheaper Type 31 will replace the Royal Navy's Type 22 and Type 23 frigate fleets.

The Type 26 in UK service will be equipped with an advanced anti-submarine warfare (ASW) capability, a 24-cell strike length Mk 41 VLS for long-range strike weapons such as the Tomahawk, a 48-cell vertical launch silo (VLS) for Sea Ceptor anti-air missiles, a 5-inch gun, and is capable of landing a Chinook helicopter on its flight deck.

On 29 June 2018 the Australian Government announced that the Type 26 had been selected to fulfil the Royal Australian Navy's Future Frigate requirement. The Government also announced that the ships were to be built in Australia with Australian specific modifications and would be named the "Hunter Class" in Australian service. The Government stated that,

"The Hunter class will provide the Australian Defence Force with the highest levels of lethality and deterrence our major surface combatants need in periods of global uncertainty. The Hunter class will have the capability to conduct a variety of missions independently, or as part of a task group, with sufficient range and endurance to operate effectively throughout the region. The frigates will also have the flexibility to support non-warfare roles such as humanitarian assistance and disaster relief. Incorporating the leading edge Australian-developed CEA Phased-Array Radar and the US Navy’s Aegis combat management system, with an Australian interface developed by Saab Australia, the Hunter class will be one of the most capable warships in the world."

Design 

A Saab tactical interface with the Aegis combat interface will be used. The vessel will be able to carry one MH-60R ASW helicopter, and has the ability to host other Australian aircraft such as the MRH90 helicopter.

Construction 
The ships will be built by BAE Systems Australia at Osborne Naval Shipyard. First steel was cut on prototype blocks in December 2021. This is to be followed in 2023 with first steel being cut on blocks that will actually be used in ships of the class.

Ships

See also  
 Canadian Surface Combatant
 F110-class frigate

References

External links
 Hunter-Class FFG

Frigates of the Royal Australian Navy
Proposed ships
Shipbuilding in Australia